Tuahzawl is located near Rawpuichhip(3 km) and near to state capital Aizawl which is 40 km away, it is located near Lengpui Airport which is about 20 km and it is located in Mamit district in the Indian state of Mizoram. Pin Code - 796410

Geography
Tuahzawl is located at

Demographics
 India census, Tuahzawl had a population of 408. Males constitute 51% of the population and females 49%. Tuahzawl has an average literacy rate of 78%, higher than the national average of 59.5%: male literacy is 79%, and female literacy is 78%. In Tuahzawl, 17% of the population is under 6 years of age.

References

Mamit
Cities and towns in Mamit district